Holcombe Flowage is a reservoir on the Chippewa River in Chippewa County and Rusk County, Wisconsin. The dam stands between the towns of Birch Creek and Lake Holcombe, just west of the settlement of Holcombe, Wisconsin, in Chippewa County, where most of the reservoir lies. A small part of the reservoir also extends northward into the Town of Willard in Rusk County.

The flowage is a popular recreation area, and the shores are thick with homes and cottages.

Holcombe Dam  
The current Holcombe Dam is a hydro-electric facility built in 1950 by the Wisconsin-Minnesota Light and Power Company, and is now owned and operated by Xcel Energy. It produces an average of 34 megawatts, and is one of six Xcel hydro plants on the Chippewa.

The flowage was originally created by the 1878 Little Falls Dam impounding the Chippewa. The dam was built by Elijah Swift and Joseph Viles for the Chippewa River Improvement and Log Driving Company to provide reliable water for floating logs downstream. Parts of the dam were washed out by floods in 1880 and 1884. A terrible accident occurred in 1905, when eleven log drivers drowned trying to get to a log jam near the dam. The dam functioned until 1910, when logging operations ceased. It washed out in the 1920s.

References 

Reservoirs in Wisconsin
Dams in Wisconsin
Xcel Energy dams
Dams completed in 1950
Energy infrastructure completed in 1950
Landforms of Chippewa County, Wisconsin
Landforms of Rusk County, Wisconsin
Hydroelectric power plants in Wisconsin